Morwalela Seema (born 21 May 1949) is a Motswana former footballer who played as a striker for Mahalapye-based club Queens Park Rangers, Township Rollers and the Botswana national football team. He retired from professional football in 1984 as one of the best Batswana to ever grace the game.

Career
Seema started to play football in primary school and joined the Queens Park Rangers development team in 1966. Two years later he was promoted to the first team and earned his first call-up to the national team, then known as Botswana XI. Although his travel was rushed, due to having been called later than the other players, and he had no proper football boots, he greatly impressed and even scored the team's only goal as they lost 3-1 to Swaziland. Seema would go on to become a regular member of the Botswana XI squad, hailed by some as the best incarnation of the Botswana national team. In 1970 he left Rangers for Township Rollers, where he became part of the Township Rollers Golden Generation which won four successive league titles under Chibaso Kande. In 1984 he quit professional football and played Sunday football for Gaborone before eventually leaving football altogether.

Honours

Club
 Township Rollers
Botswana Premier League:5
1979, 1980, 1982, 1983, 1984
FA Cup:1
1979

References

1949 births
Living people
Botswana footballers
Association football forwards
Botswana international footballers